Resurrection is a live album by the English rock band Pretty Things. It is a complete performance of their 1968 rock opera S.F. Sorrow, recorded thirty years later in Abbey Road Studios.

History 
Resurrection was recorded on September 6, 1998, in Abbey Road Studio 2. The concert was given in front of a small audience of family and friends and was broadcast live on the Internet.

The Pretty Things consisted at that point of the same line-up who had recorded the original album in the same studio, except for Twink, who was replaced by long-time Pretty Things member Skip Alan. Mark St. John, the band's manager, and Dov Skipper, the son of Skip Alan, provided percussions, and Frank Holland contributed guitar and vocals. Guest Arthur Brown read the narrative interludes between the songs, which did not appear in the original album, while David Gilmour played lead guitar on some songs.

The concert was first released on CD in a limited edition in 1999, then in a 2-CD edition with S.F. Sorrow in 2003. That same year, a DVD of the performance was released under the title S.F. Sorrow Live at Abbey Road.

Track listing

Personnel

Pretty Things
 Phil May – vocals
 Dick Taylor – guitar, vocals
 Jon Povey – keyboards, vocals
 Wally Waller – bass, vocals
 Skip Alan – drums
 Frank Holland – guitar, vocals

Guests
 Mark St. John – percussion
 Dov Skipper – percussion
 Arthur Brown – narration
 David Gilmour – guitar on "She Says Good Morning", "I See You", "Well of Destiny", "Trust" and "Old Man Going"

References

1999 albums
Concept albums
Pretty Things albums
Rock operas
Snapper Music albums